List of works by or about George Steiner.

Books
Fantasy Poets Number Eight. Fantasy Press, Eynsham, 1952. (Seven poems.)
Tolstoy or Dostoevsky: An Essay in Contrast, Faber and Faber, 1959
The Death of Tragedy, Faber and Faber, 1961
Homer: A Collection of Critical Essays, 1962
Anno Domini: Three Stories, Faber and Faber, 1964
The Penguin Book of Modern Verse Translation, Penguin, 1966
Language and Silence: Essays 1958-1966, Faber and Faber, 1967
Poem Into Poem: World Poetry in Modern Verse Translation, Penguin, 1970
In Bluebeard's Castle: Some Notes Towards the Redefinition of Culture, Faber and Faber, 1971
Extraterritorial: Papers on Literature and the Language Revolution, Faber and Faber, 1972
The Sporting Scene: White Knights of Reykjavik, Faber and Faber, 1973
Nostalgia for the Absolute, 1974
Fields of Force: Fischer and Spassky at Reykjavik, 1974
After Babel: Aspects of Language and Translation, Oxford University Press, 1975
Why English?, Oxford University Press, 1975
Contemporary Approaches to English Studies, Heinemann Education, 1977
Has Truth a Future?, BBC, 1978—The Bronowski Memorial Lecture 1978
Heidegger, Fontana Modern Masters, 1978
On Difficulty and Other Essays, Oxford University Press, 1978
The Uncommon Reader, 1978
The Portage to San Cristobal of A.H., Faber and Faber, 1981
Antigones, Clarendon Press, 1984
George Steiner: A Reader, Penguin, 1984
A Reading Against Shakespeare, University of Glasgow, 1986
Real Presences: Is There Anything in What We Say?, Faber and Faber, 1989
Proofs and Three Parables, Faber and Faber, 1992
What is Comparative Literature?, Clarendon Press, 1995—an inaugural lecture before the University of Oxford, UK on October 11, 1994
Homer in English, Penguin, 1996 (Editor)
No Passion Spent: Essays 1978-1996, Faber and Faber, 1996
The Deeps of the Sea, and Other Fiction, Faber and Faber, 1996
Errata: An Examined Life, Weidenfeld and Nicolson, 1997
Grammars of Creation, Faber and Faber, 2001
Lessons of the Masters, Harvard University Press, 2003
The Idea of Europe, Nexus Institute, 2004
Nostalgia for the Absolute, House of Anansi Press, 2004
At Five in the Afternoon, in Kenyon Review and Pushcart Prize XXVIII, 2004 (fiction)
Le Silence des Livres, Arléa, 2006
My Unwritten Books, New Directions, 2008
George Steiner at The New Yorker, New Directions, 2008
Les Logocrates, L'Herne, 2008
A cinq heures de l'après-midi, L'Herne, 2008 (fiction)
Ceux qui brûlent les livres, L'Herne, 2008
The Poetry of Thought: From Hellenism to Celan, New Directions, 2011

Articles

Critical studies and reviews of Steiner's work

References

External links
George Steiner. Contemporary Writers.
George Steiner bibliography. Fantastic Fiction.

Bibliographies by writer
Bibliographies of American writers
 
Philosophy bibliographies